Istok is a rural locality (a village) in Orlovskoye Rural Settlement, Velikoustyugsky District, Vologda Oblast, Russia. The population was 1 as of 2002.

Geography 
The distance to Veliky Ustyug is 76 km, to Chernevo is 8 km. Arkhangelskaya Melnitsa is the nearest rural locality.

References 

Rural localities in Velikoustyugsky District